A two-volume work titled The Speeches of Adolf Hitler, April 1922 – August 1939 was published by Oxford University Press in 1942 under auspices of the Royal Institute of International Affairs.

Overview
The foreword is by the Chairman of the Council at the time, Waldorf Astor, 2nd Viscount Astor.

Being a collection of representative passages arranged under subjects, the speeches are neither complete, self-contained, nor necessarily in chronological order. Interviews with journalists are also included.

It was edited by Professor Norman Hepburn Baynes who translated from the German at times with a self-confessed difficulty due to a ‘diffuseness‘ in National Socialist terminology. Where authorised English translations existed, Baynes used these. Interviews published in French journals are quoted un-translated.

Baynes completed the task over a two-year period commencing with the outbreak of World War II and October 1941.

Contents of the publication
VOLUME I
FOREWORD
PREFACE
LIST OF ABBREVIATIONS
1. EARLY SPEECHES 1922-1924
2. THE FORMATION OF THE PARTY: HITLER‘S RETROSPECT
3. THE PROGRAMME OF THE PARTY
4. THE EARLY DAYS OF THE PARTY
5. THE 'PUTSCH' OF 8-9 NOVEMBER 1923
6. LEGALITY
7. THE SA. AND SS.
 Note: The SA.
8. STEPS TO POWER 
9. ORGANIZATION OF THE PARTY:THE MEANING OF THE ANNUAL GATHERINGS OF THE PARTY-THE PARTEITAGE
10. THE MODEL REVOLUTION
11. THE MOVEMENT AND THE OPPOSITION
12. GLEICHSCHALTUNG
13. THE ROEHM PURGE
14. RELIGION
 Note: The Treatment of Religion by Hitler in Mein Kampf.
15. CONSTITUTION
 Note: The Constitution of the National Socialist State.
16. CRITICISM AND LIBERTY 
17. LAW
 Note on Law18. WOMAN
19. YOUTH
20. THE ARMY
21. KULTUR
22. THE OUTLOOK FOR THE FUTURE: THE TASKS OF THE MOVEMENT
23. THE YEARS IN RETROSPECT AS HITLER SAW THEM
24. BOLSHEVISM
25. THE JEWS
 Note and Bibliography.''
26. ECONOMICS
VOLUME II
27. FOREIGN POLICY
NOTES
I. ADDENDA
II. BIBLIOGRAPHICAL NOTE
INDEXES
I. INDEX OF SPEECHES
II. LIST OF NAMES OF AUTHORS
III. GENERAL INDEX

See also
List of books by or about Adolf Hitler
List of Adolf Hitler speeches

Notes

References 

 
 

1942 non-fiction books
Books about Nazism
Books about the far right
Speeches by Adolf Hitler